Glascock County is a county located in the U.S. state of Georgia. As of the 2020 census, the population was 2,884, making it the fourth-least populous county in Georgia. The county seat is Gibson. The county was created on December 19, 1857.

History
The county is named after Thomas Glascock,  a soldier in the War of 1812, general in the First Seminole War and U.S. representative.

Geography
It is the fourth-smallest county in Georgia by area.

The vast majority of Glascock County is located in the Upper Ogeechee River sub-basin of the Ogeechee River basin, with just the very northeastern corner of the county, northeast of State Route 80, located in the Brier Creek sub-basin of the Savannah River basin.

Major highways
  State Route 80
  State Route 102
  State Route 123
  State Route 171

Adjacent counties
 Warren County - north
 Jefferson County - southeast
 Hancock County - northwest
 Washington County - southwest

Demographics

2000 census
At the 2000 census there were 2,556 people, 1,004 households, and 715 families living in the county. The population density was 18 people per square mile (7/km2). There were 1,192 housing units at an average density of 8 per square mile (3/km2).  The racial makeup of the county was 90.61% White, 8.29% Black or African American, 0.23% Native American, 0.12% from other races, and 0.74% from two or more races. 0.47% of the population were Hispanic or Latino of any race.
Of the 1,004 households 32.80% had children under the age of 18 living with them, 58.70% were married couples living together, 9.60% had a female householder with no husband present, and 28.70% were non-families. 26.30% of households were one person and 11.90% were one person aged 65 or older. The average household size was 2.44 and the average family size was 2.94.

The age distribution was 23.80% under the age of 18, 7.70% from 18 to 24, 26.80% from 25 to 44, 23.50% from 45 to 64, and 18.20% 65 or older. The median age was 40 years. For every 100 females there were 92.50 males. For every 100 females age 18 and over, there were 87.60 males.

The median household income was $29,743 and the median family income  was $36,629. Males had a median income of $32,896 versus $22,500 for females. The per capita income for the county was $14,185. About 9.40% of families and 17.20% of the population were below the poverty line, including 10.70% of those under age 18 and 38.50% of those age 65 or over.

2010 census
At the 2010 census, there were 3,082 people, 1,162 households, and 804 families living in the county. The racial makeup of the county was 89.8% white, 8.2% black or African American, 0.2% American Indian, 0.6% from other races, and 1.1% from two or more races. Those of Hispanic or Latino origin made up 1.1% of the population. In terms of ancestry, 41.7% were American, 6.4% were English, 6.1% were Irish, and 5.4% were German.

Of the 1,162 households, 37.3% had children under the age of 18 living with them, 51.9% were married couples living together, 13.4% had a female householder with no husband present, 30.8% were non-families, and 26.6% of households were made up of individuals. The average household size was 2.58 and the average family size was 3.14. The median age was 39.3 years.

The median household income was $37,149 and the median family income  was $46,283. Males had a median income of $37,957 versus $26,953 for females. The per capita income for the county was $16,844. About 13.0% of families and 16.6% of the population were below the poverty line, including 19.0% of those under age 18 and 20.0% of those age 65 or over.

2020 census

As of the 2020 United States Census, there were 2,884 people, 1,108 households, and 726 families residing in the county.

Communities
 Agricola
 Bastonville
 Edge Hill
 Gibson (county seat)
 Mitchell

Politics
Glascock County, a rural, sparsely-populated, majority-white county, is arguably the most Republican of Georgia's 159 counties, and one of the most Republican counties in the United States, with almost 90 percent of voters supporting Donald Trump in 2020. In addition, Republican percentages have been in the 80s since 2004, and the last Democrat to win the county was Georgian Jimmy Carter in 1980.

See also

 Central Savannah River Area
 National Register of Historic Places listings in Glascock County, Georgia
List of counties in Georgia

References

External links
 The News and Farmer and Wadley Herald/ Jefferson Reporter, the county's weekly newspaper and the oldest weekly newspaper in Georgia
 Glascock County historical marker

 
Georgia (U.S. state) counties
1857 establishments in Georgia (U.S. state)
Populated places established in 1857